

Events calendar

+08